Juan Antonio de Andrés Rodríguez (born 1942) is a Spanish politician who belonged to the Union of the Democratic Centre (UCD) and who previously served as President of the Government of Aragon, one of the Spanish regional administrations, from 1982 to 1983.

References

1942 births
Living people
Presidents of the Government of Aragon
Union of the Democratic Centre (Spain) politicians